Sep Visser (born 14 December 1990 in Zeewolde) is a Netherlands international rugby union player. He most recently played as a dual player for Boroughmuir RFC and Edinburgh Rugby, playing as a centre and a wing.

Early career
He joined the Newcastle Falcons Academy as a teenager, following his brother Tim Visser. After moving from the Netherlands (where he played for RC Hilversum) to England, he joined the Newcastle Falcons Academy and went on to represent the Falcons in the Middlesex Sevens in 2007. He remained at Kingston Park until 2009, then he joined Tynedale R.F.C.

Club career
He was successful at Tynedale R.F.C. having scored 23 tries in 29 games in the 2010–2011 season for the Northumberland club.

In July 2011 Visser agreed a professional contract with for the 2011–12 season but would initially play on a dual contract with Boroughmuir RFC. He joined brother Tim, who was the top scorer in the 2010–11 Magners League.  It was announced in April 2013, that he had been released from Edinburgh Rugby.

International career
He has been capped 15 times by the Netherlands national rugby union team

His father, Marc Visser, is the most capped played for the Netherlands national rugby union team. His brother Tim represents the Scotland national rugby union team.

References

External links
Official Twitter account
Journal Live (England)
Planet Rugby (England)
Boroughmuir RFC Official Page (Scotland)

1990 births
Living people
Edinburgh Rugby players
Dutch rugby union players
People from Zeewolde
Tynedale R.F.C. players
Dutch emigrants to Scotland
Sportspeople from Flevoland
Netherlands international rugby union players
Rugby union centres